Gonempeda is a genus of crane fly in the family Limoniidae.

Species
G. armata Savchenko, 1971
G. burra (Alexander, 1924)
G. flava (Schummel, 1829)
G. nyctops (Alexander, 1916)
G. yellowstonensis (Alexander, 1943)

References

Limoniidae
Nematocera genera